Lamorinda is an area within Contra Costa County, California in the United States. The name is a portmanteau from the names of the three cities that make up the region: Lafayette, Moraga and Orinda.  

Lamorinda sits east of the Berkeley Hills between the Caldecott Tunnel and Walnut Creek. It is also referred to as the "Highway 24" corridor, referring to the state highway that is the primary thoroughfare in the region. Many residents commute west through the tunnel to San Francisco and Oakland or east to Walnut Creek and Concord.

As of 2010 the three cities had a combined population of 57,552, with Lafayette having the largest population and Moraga the smallest.

Differences among the three cities
Each city is distinct from the others, but the three share many similar characteristics such as suburban bedroom communities with little industry. The region has been called "wealthy" by the San Francisco Chronicle.
The public high schools in each of the cities are part of the Acalanes Union High School District, one of the highest ranked high school districts in California.

With a cluster of restaurants and generally high-end shops in its downtown, Lafayette is considered the retail hub of the region. Orinda is home to the historic Orinda Theatre and the California Shakespeare Theater. Moraga is home to Saint Mary's College of California.

Transportation
Lafayette and Orinda are located along Highway 24. Moraga, located to the south, is more isolated; a pair of two-lane roads connect it to Orinda and Lafayette and Highway 24 to the north.

Central county

Lamorinda is located in the western part of Contra Costa County.

The central part of the county is a valley traversed by Interstate 680 and Highway 24. The towns east of the hills, on or near Highway 24 and their surrounding areas (Lafayette, Moraga and Orinda) are collectively known as Lamorinda. The major central county cities along Interstate 680 are Martinez, Concord, Pleasant Hill, Walnut Creek, Danville, San Ramon, and unincorporated Alamo.

References

Geography of Contra Costa County, California
Subregions of the San Francisco Bay Area